The Special Police Forces is a Ukrainian volunteer corps of law enforcement units, part of the Ministry of Internal Affairs of Ukraine. It was originally created for prevention of criminal encroachment and defence of civil order on 15 April 2014, following the Russian invasion of Ukraine. During the ongoing war in Donbas, the forces of the Special Tasks Patrol Police have fought against pro-Russian separatists as a paramilitary force.

History 
In April 2014, Minister of Internal Affairs Arsen Avakov issued an order to create battalions of special purpose within the Ministry of Internal Affairs structure. Their goal was to protect public order and important facilities across Ukraine, but all of these units were eventually sent to the east to counter Russian aggression. After the reformation of National Police in 2015, the units were reformed as Special Task Patrol Police units.

The SPF inducted its first Offensive Guard Police Brigade in February 2023 to cope with the needs of the NPU in response to the 2022 Russian invasion of Ukraine. The Luit Brigade was activated that month on orders from the MIA of Ukraine and is manned by personnel of the SPF formations.

List of Special Tasks Patrol Police units

Special Police Forces 
 Bohdan Company, Khmelnytskyi Oblast
 Chernihiv Company, Chernihiv Oblast
 Dnipro-1 Regiment, Dnipro Oblast
 Armored Battalion
 2nd Company
 Aerorozvidka
 5th Company Donetsk
 Krym Company
 East Company, Kharkiv, Kharkiv Oblast
 Ivano-Frankivsk Company, Ivano-Frankivsk
 Kherson Company, Kherson, Kherson Oblast
 Kryvbas Company, Dnipro Oblast
 Kyiv Regiment, Kyiv, Kyiv Oblast
 1st Police Company Kyiv-1
 2nd Police Company Kyiv-2
 3rd Police Company Zoloti Vorota
 4th Police Company Sich
 Lviv Battalion, Lviv, Lviv Oblast
 Lyut Brigade, Kyiv, Kyiv Oblast
 Tsunami Assault Regiment
 Safari Assault Regiment
 Luhansk-1 Special Purpose Police Battalion
 Myrotvorets Regiment, Kyiv
 2nd Kyivschyna Company
 3rd Company Harpoon
 4th Company
 Poltava Battalion, Poltava, Poltava Oblast
 Shtorm Battalion, Odesa, Odesa Oblast
 Sicheslav Company, Dnipro, Dnipro Oblast
 Skif Battalion, Zaporizhzhia Oblast
 Berda Company
 Sumy Company, Sumy, Sumy Oblast
 Svityaz Company, Volyn Oblast
 Svyatoslav Company, Kirovohrad Oblast
 Ternopil Company, Ternopil, Ternopil Oblast
 Vinnytsya Battalion, Vinnytsia Oblast
 Zakhid Battalion, Volyn Oblast

Gallery

References 

 
Volunteer military formations of Ukraine
Battalions of Ukraine
Ministry of Internal Affairs (Ukraine)